Venusia laria is a moth in the family Geometridae first described by Charles Oberthür in 1893. It is found in China and Japan.

The wingspan is 17–21 mm.

Subspecies
Venusia laria laria (China)
Venusia laria ilara (Prout, 1938) (Japan)

References

Moths described in 1893
Venusia (moth)
Moths of Japan